Fatemeh Khalili Behfar (born June 30, 1996) is a handball player from Iran. She is a member of Turkey's Antalya Anadolu SK club and also the Iranian women's national handball team as a goalkeeper. She has participated in five Asian senior championships so far.

Women's World Handball Championship in 2021 
In the 2021 World Women's Handball Championship in Spain, in the second meeting of the Iranian women's national handball team, he was selected as the best player on the field against the Norwegian national team with 18 saves and made history.
Norway goalkeeper Silje Solberg said: "Fateme was incredibly impressive." One of the best performances I have seen on the handball field. I am proud of this goalkeeper and I am very impressed. He also played a great game against Romania.

References 

1996 births
Living people
People from Qom
Expatriate handball players
Iranian expatriate sportspeople in Turkey
Iranian female handball players
21st-century Iranian women